This article describes movies made jointly by cinema production houses of India, typically West Bengal (Tollywood), and Bangladesh (Dhallywood).

History 
In the 1980s and 1990s,  there was a significant number of Indo-Bangladesh joint production films. However, after 2004–2005, the number of Indo-Bangla joint production films decreased. However, in the 2010s, Indo-Bangladeshi joint ventures began gaining more popularity and have become more common, often produced by Eskay Movies of India and Jaaz Multimedia of Bangladesh.

However, after different controversies regarding the joint venture films in 2017, the government of Bangladesh have temporarily stopped all joint ventures until a new policy is put in place. The controversy is mainly about the production house Jaaz Multimedia and the films they have produced, which commonly feature more Indian cast and crew than Bangladeshis. In an article by Prothom Alo, this controversy has been described as creating two factions in the Bangladeshi film industry, one which claims that Jaaz Multimedia has broken the country's rules of international co-productions by making Indian films under the name of joint productions, and another which backs Jaaz Multimedia by claiming that their films are reviving the lost glory of Bangladeshi cinema.

After the Bangladesh government announced it was temporarily stopping all joint production films in 2017, it was announced that a new committee would be formed to approve scripts and preview the films before production and release. Later in January 2018, Bangladesh Information Minister Hasanul Haq Inu revealed that new rules for would be relaxed for co-productions, making it easier for films to have one director and film in other countries. The new co-production guidelines, released by the Bangladeshi government, state that permission can be sought to bring equipments from other countries, a production house cannot apply for a film review within 30 days of getting a nod from the Bangladesh Film Development Corporation and Ministry of Information, maximum duration of submission is 9 months to a year, and the guidelines also allow for a director or producer from a third country to join the film. However, the new guidelines for the co-productions state that approval will only be given to original content. This move, endorsed by director of Grassroot Entertainment Amit Jumrani, will create space for new and original ideas in an industry with many remakes.

Films
This is the list of some of the notable Bangladesh-India joint venture films.

Frequent joint venture collaborators 
This list contains production companies, directors, and actors who have worked multiple times in Indo-Bangla co-productions.

Production companies

Directors

Actors

Music directors

References

Cinema of Bangladesh
Cinema of West Bengal